Ruben Varona is a Colombian author and literary critic, specialized in crime and historical fiction.

Born in Popayán (1980), he teaches in the Department of Spanish and Portuguese at Miami University. He has a Ph.D. in Hispanic Literature from Texas Tech University (2018), and a bilingual M.F.A. in Creative Writing from the University of Texas at El Paso (2012). He is the co-founder of the Revista Cultural La Mandrágora in Popayán. His deep interest in crime fiction has gained him recognition, being elected Vice-President for Latin American of the International Association of Crime Writers AIEP-IACW (2008-2016).

Rubén Varona’s writing explores social conflicts and the potential for individual resistance. His literary and academic work reveal structural problems in fictional societies raising awareness of conflicting perspectives of social justice. For example, his coauthored novel La secta de los asesinos (2016), approaches today’s terrorism from a historical perspective that humanizes the political and religious tensions between East and West. This work was a finalist for the Premio Planeta-Casa de América award (2012), and the media credited it for anticipating to the foundation of the Islamic State. Varona’s writing style uses the brutality, obscenity and crime to expose the dark skeleton of reality, and to reveal the ugliness implicit in our canon of beauty. For example, about his novel La hora del cheesecake (2015), the critic has highlighted the “intensity of language that forces the reader to place themselves in different planes and levels for the reconfiguration of both time and discourse”, and how it masterfully mixes the high and low culture, as well as the thriller and the corrosive satire without using the Anglo-Saxon models.

He has been chosen for several collections and anthologies of short stories: “Hospital psiquiátrico” en Desierto en escarlata: cuentos criminales de Ciudad Juárez. (Ed. Colectivo Zurdo Medieta, 2018), “Meninas Club” en Short Story anthology: Latein-Amerika (Ed. Beatrix Kramlovsky and Sylvia Unterrander. Trans. Eva Srna, 2014), “Punto Negro” en Céfiro: Enlace Hispano Cultural y Literario (2013), “Der Lackierte Spazierstock” en Crime fiction anthology: Zurich, Ausfahrt Mord. Switzerland. (Ed. Paul Ott. Trans. Susanna Mende, 2011), “El olor de los jazmines” en Rio Grande Review (2010), “Un vuelo de algo con alas de polvo.” Señales de Ruta. Antología del cuento colombiano. (Ed. Juan Pablo Plata, 2008), “Los restos del patriarca” en El Fungible. Especial de relatos para España y América Latina. (Ed. Ayuntamiento de Alcobendas 2008), and “Cábala en re menor” in the anthology Al filo de las palabras (Ed. Carlos Muñoz, 2001).

Publications

Novels
La secta de los asesinos (2016)(co-author with Carlos Bermeo)
La hora del cheesecake (2015)
 El sastre de las sombras (2013)
Espérame desnuda entre los alacranes (2007)

References

External links
 www.rubenvarona.com
 News about the novel El sastre de las sombras
 International Association of Crime Writers – AIEP

20th-century Colombian novelists
Colombian male novelists
Colombian male short story writers
Colombian short story writers
People from Cauca Department
1980 births
Living people
Postmodern writers
20th-century short story writers
20th-century male writers